The second season of Drag Race Holland premiered on 6 August and concluded on 24 September 2021. The competition is broadcast on Videoland in the Netherlands and on WOW Presents Plus internationally. The competition sees ten Dutch drag queens compete for the title of the next Dutch Drag Superstar, a cash prize of €15,000, a crown and scepter by Fierce Drag Jewels, and a stage on the 2022 edition of the Dutch Milkshake festival.

The cast was officially announced via social media on 27 July 2021.

The winner of the second season was Vanessa Van Cartier, with My Little Puny ending as runner-up.

Contestants

Ages, names, and cities stated are at time of filming.

Notes:

Contestant progress

Lip syncs
Legend:

Guest judges
On 4 August 2021, Marieke Samallo was confirmed to be Nikkie Plessen's replacement as main judge.

Listed in chronological order:

Elise Schaap, actress and singer
, actress and stand-up comedian
, actor and presenter
, singer, actor and presenter
, comedian, singer and actor
Merol, singer and actress
Tina de Bruin, actress
Glennis Grace, singer
Envy Peru, winner on the first season of Drag Race Holland

Special guests
Guests who appeared in episodes, but did not judge on the main stage.

Episode 1
ChelseaBoy, contestant on the first season of Drag Race Holland
Envy Peru, winner on the first season of Drag Race Holland
Janey Jacké, runner-up on the first season of Drag Race Holland
Madame Madness, contestant on the first season of Drag Race Holland
Ma'Ma Queen, contestant on the first season of Drag Race Holland
Megan Schoonbrood, contestant on the first season of Drag Race Holland
Miss Abby OMG, contestant on the first season of Drag Race Holland
Patty Pam-Pam, contestant on the first season of Drag Race Holland
Roem, contestant on the first season of Drag Race Holland
Sederginne, contestant on the first season of Drag Race Holland

Episode 3
Elise Schaap, actress and singer

Episode 4
Dusty Gersanowitz, drag queen
Gerald van Windt, choreographer
Damian Overduyn, assistant choreographer

Episode 5
Dolf Pasker and Gert Kasteel, first legally recognized same-sex married couple worldwide

Episode 6
, presenter

Episode 7
, actor

Episode 8
Famke Louise, YouTuber and singer
Josephine Kay, Cosmopolitan editor
Ma'Ma Queen, Miss Congenialty of season 1

Episodes

References

2021 Dutch television seasons
2021 in LGBT history
Drag Race Holland seasons